Chirag United Club Kerala is an Indian association football club based in Kerala. The club was formed in 2004 as Viva Kerala before being renamed as Chirag United Club Kerala in 2011.

Chirag United Club Kerala have never won the League championship, and the Federation Cup.

Key

 P = Played
 W = Games won
 D = Games drawn
 L = Games lost
 F = Goals for
 A = Goals against
 Pts = Points
 Pos = Final position

 IL = I-League
 IL2 = I-League 2nd Division

 F = Final
 Group = Group stage
 R16 = Round of 16
 QF = Quarter-finals

 R1 = Round 1
 R2 = Round 2
 R3 = Round 3
 R4 = Round 4
 R5 = Round 5
 R6 = Round 6
 SF = Semi-finals

Seasons

Chirag United Club Kerala
Chirag United
Chirag United